The Frisco Schoolhouse (Site ID 5ST258), now a local museum registered on the National Register of Historic Places, is an original one-room schoolhouse located in the Frisco Historic Park in Frisco, Colorado. The schoolhouse is located on its original location. The building was first built as a saloon in the 1890s and later (c.1902) converted to a school, which now contains original blackboards and school desks. The museum also contains information about Ute people, Dillon Reservoir, mining, late 1800s clothing, and photographs.

The Frisco Historic Park includes other original Frisco buildings from the late 1800s, including: a log chapel, jail, trapper's cabin and furnished homes.

It was deemed significant for NRHP listing as it is the oldest standing schoolhouse in the town, and was the only school from 1902 to 1940.

Frisco Schoolhouse

Frisco Historic Park
In addition to the Frisco Schoolhouse Museum, the Frisco Historic Park includes the following structures:
 Bailey House (c. 1895)
 Bill's Ranch House (c. 1890)
 Frank and Annie Ruth House (c. 1890)
 Frisco Jail (c. 1881)
 Log Chapel (c. 1943)
 Niemoth Cabin (c. 1931)
 Prestrud / Staley House (c. 1899)
 Spring House (c. 1900)
 Trapper's Cabin (c. 1942)
 Wood's Cabin (c. 1860)

See also
 Frisco, Colorado in Summit County, Colorado
 National Register of Historic Places listings in Colorado

References

External links
 Frisco Historic Park
 Frisco Historic Park Walking Tour

Museums in Summit County, Colorado
One-room schoolhouses in Colorado
School buildings on the National Register of Historic Places in Colorado
School buildings completed in 1902
Open-air museums in Colorado
National Register of Historic Places in Summit County, Colorado